The Tour Alsace (or Tour d'Alsace) is a 6-day road bicycle race held annually in Alsace, France. It was first held in 2004 and it is a 2.2 rated event on the UCI Europe Tour.

Winners

External links
 

UCI Europe Tour races
Cycle races in France
Recurring sporting events established in 2004
2004 establishments in France
Sport in Bas-Rhin
Sport in Haut-Rhin